Ferit Hoxha (born 22 February 1967 in Koplik, Albania) is the Permanent Representative of Albania to the United Nations, in New York City. He previously served in the role from 2009 to 2015, was succeeded by Besiana Kadare, and again assumed the role in October 2021.

Early life and education
Hoxha graduated from the University of Tirana in French language and civilization. In 1992, he attended the Netherlands Institute of International Relations at Clingendael in the Hague. In 1998, he attended the Center of International and Security Studies in Maryland, in the United States. In 2007, he attended a course for high level management at Georgetown University.

Career
Hoxha joined the Albanian Ministry of Foreign Affairs in 1991. From 1993 to 1995, he was Deputy Director for Multilateral Cooperation and International Relations in the Ministry of Foreign Affairs in Albania. In 1995, he served as Counselor to the Permanent Mission of Albania to the United Nations in New York. From 1996 to 1998, he was the Director of that Department for Multilateral Cooperation and International Relations in the Ministry of Foreign Affairs.

From 1998 to 2001, Hoxha was Head of the Mission of Albania to the European Union in Brussels and concurrently Ambassador to Belgium and Luxembourg from 1999 to 2001. From 2001 to 2006, Hoxha was the Ambassador to France, and from 2003 to 2006, he was Ambassador to Portugal, resident in Paris. From 2001 to 2007, he was Personal Representative of the Head of State to the Permanent Council of the International Organization of la Francophonie.

Between 2006 and 2009, he was Secretary General of the Ministry of Foreign Affairs. During this time he served also as National Coordinator for the Alliance of Civilizations and National Coordinator for the Barcelona Process–Union for the Mediterranean, a position he held since 2008. From September 2007 to September 2009, he was also Albania’s Governor to the International Atomic Energy Agency (IAEA) Board of Governors.

He was the Permanent Representative of Albania to the United Nations, in New York City, from 2009 to 2015, when he was succeeded by Besiana Kadare. He was then Director General for Political and Strategic Issues at the Ministry of Foreign Affairs of Albania from 2015 to 2021. He returned to the United Nations as Permanent Representative in October 2021. For the month of June 2022, Hoxha serves as president of the United Nations Security Council, succeeding United States ambassador Linda Thomas-Greenfield, who served as UNSC President for May 2022.

Distinctions
Hoxha was awarded the title of "Grand Officier de l'Ordre du Mérite" of the French Republic. He was bestowed the title "Ufficiale del Ordine dela Stella d'Italia". He was awarded the title "Personnalité Francophone" by the Minister of Foreign Affairs of Albania, for the year 2007.

Personal life
He is married to Armelle Montenot, and they have two children.

References

Permanent Representatives of Albania to the United Nations
Living people
1967 births
Ambassadors of Albania to Cuba
Ambassadors of Albania to Belgium
Ambassadors of Albania to Luxembourg
Ambassadors of Albania to the European Union
Ambassadors of Albania to France
Ambassadors of Albania to Portugal
University of Tirana alumni
People from Malësi e Madhe